The Russia women's national volleyball team is governed by the Russian Volleyball Federation and participated in international volleyball competitions. They played from 1949 to 1991 as the Soviet Union and as the CIS in 1992.

In response to the 2022 Russian invasion of Ukraine, the International Volleyball Federation suspended all Russian national teams, clubs, and officials, as well as beach and snow volleyball athletes, from all events. The European Volleyball Confederation (CEV) also banned all Russian national teams, clubs, and officials from participating in European competition, and suspended all members of Russia from their respective functions in CEV organs.

Major world titles

USSR

# – 4 major titles in row in late 1960s - early 1970s (World Women's Volleyball Championship, World Cup, Olympic Games)

Russia

Results

Olympic Games
Soviet Union
 1964 –  Silver medal
 1968 –  Gold medal
 1972 –  Gold medal
 1976 –  Silver medal
 1980 –  Gold medal
 1988 –  Gold medal

Unified Team
 1992 –  Silver medal

Russia
 1996 – 4th place
 2000 –  Silver medal
 2004 –  Silver medal
 2008 – 5th place (tied)
 2012 – 5th place (tied)
 2016 – 5th place (tied)

ROC
 2020 – 7th place

FIVB World Championship
Soviet Union
 1952 –  Gold medal
 1956 –  Gold medal
 1960 –  Gold medal
 1962 –  Silver medal
 1970 –  Gold medal
 1974 –  Silver medal
 1978 –  Bronze medal
 1982 – 6th place
 1986 – 6th place
 1990 –  Gold medal

Russia
 1994 –  Bronze medal
 1998 –  Bronze medal
 2002 –  Bronze medal
 2006 –  Gold medal
 2010 –  Gold medal
 2014 – 5th place
 2018 – 8th place
 2022 – Banned by FIVB

FIVB Volleyball World Grand Champions Cup
 1993 –  Bronze medal
 1997 –  Gold medal
 2001 –  Silver medal
 2013 – 4th place
 2017 – 4th place

FIVB World Cup
Soviet Union
1973 –  Gold medal
1977 – 7th place (tied)
1981 –   Bronze medal
1985 –  Bronze medal
1989 –  Silver medal
1991 –  Bronze medal

Russia
1999 –  Silver medal
2015 – 4th place
2019 –  Bronze medal

FIVB World Grand Prix
Russia
 1993 –  Bronze medal
 1994 – 7th place
 1995 – 6th place
 1996 –  Bronze medal
 1997 –  Gold medal
 1998 –  Silver medal
 1999 –  Gold medal
 2000 –  Silver medal
 2001 –  Bronze medal
 2002 –  Gold medal
 2003 –  Silver medal
 2004 – 7th place
 2006 –  Silver medal
 2007 – 4th place
 2009 –  Silver medal
 2011 – 4th place
 2013 – 7th place
 2014 –  Bronze medal
 2015 –  Silver medal
 2016 – 4th place
 2017 – 9th place

FIVB Nations League
Russia
 2018 – 7th place
 2019 – 14th place
 2021 – 8th place
 2022 – Banned by FIVB

European Championship
Soviet Union
 1949 –  Gold medal
 1950 –  Gold medal
 1951 –  Gold medal
 1955 –  Silver medal
 1958 –  Gold medal
 1963 –  Gold medal
 1967 –  Gold medal
 1971 –  Gold medal
 1975 –  Gold medal
 1977 –  Gold medal
 1979 –  Gold medal
 1981 –  Silver medal
 1983 –  Silver medal
 1985 –  Gold medal
 1987 –  Silver medal
 1989 –  Gold medal
 1991 –  Gold medal

Russia
 1993 –  Gold medal
 1995 –  Bronze medal
 1997 –  Gold medal
 1999 –  Gold medal
 2001 –  Gold medal
 2003 – 5th place
 2005 –  Bronze medal
 2007 –  Bronze medal
 2009 – 6th place
 2011 – 6th place
 2013 –  Gold medal
 2015 –  Gold medal
 2017 – 6th place
 2019 – 7th place
 2021 – 6th place

Current squad
The following is the Russian roster in the 2019 FIVB Volleyball Women's World Cup.

Head coach:  Sergio Busato

References

External links

Official website
FIVB profile

Russia women
Women's
Women's
World champion national volleyball teams